John Mills (1908–2005) was a British actor.

John Mills may also refer to:

Politics

Canada
John Easton Mills (1796–1847), Canadian politician who was briefly mayor of Montreal, Quebec
John Burpee Mills (1850–1913), Canadian lawyer and member of the House of Commons
John Sproule Mills (1887–1972), mayor of Saskatoon, Saskatchewan, Canada
John Archibald Mills (1910–1985), Alberta MLA, 1955–1959

UK
John Mills (Conservative politician) (1879–1972), British Member of Parliament for New Forest and Christchurch, 1932–1945
John Remington Mills (1798–1879), English politician, MP for Wycombe
John Edmund Mills (1882–1951), British politician, MP for Dartford
John Mills (MP for Lymington), Member of Parliament (MP) for Lymington in 1625

Other countries
John Mills (Massachusetts politician) (1787–1861), American politician
John Mills (Australian politician) (born 1941), New South Wales politician
John Atta Mills (1944–2012), President of Ghana
John Harrison Mills (1842–1916), American Civil War soldier, painter, poet and early Bahá'í
John Mills (South Dakota politician), member of the South Dakota House of Representatives

Sports

Cricket
John Mills (Hampshire cricketer) (1789–1871), British soldier, politician and amateur cricketer, MP for Rochester 1831–35
John Mills (New South Wales cricketer) (1836–1899), Australian cricketer
John Mills (Gloucestershire cricketer) (1848–1935), 19th century English cricketer, played for Gloucestershire
John Mills (cricketer, born 1855) (1855–1932), English cricketer
John Mills (New Zealand cricketer) (1905–1972), New Zealand Test cricketer

Other sports
John Mills (basketball) (1919–1995), American professional basketball player
John Mills (footballer, born 1900) (1900–?) Scottish footballer from Vale of Leven, also known as Jock Mills
John Mills (footballer, born 1920) (1920–1982), footballer for Chester City and Altrincham F.C.
John Mills (footballer, born 1990), English footballer
John Mills (swimmer) (born 1953), British Olympic swimmer
John Mills (rugby union) (born 1960), New Zealand rugby union player
John Henry Mills (born 1969), American football player

Entertainment
John Mills (stage actor), (1670-1736), English stage actor
John Mills (encyclopedist) (1717–1794), English writer on agriculture
John Channell Mills (1929–1998), English theatre actor
John Mills (writer) (1930–2016), Canadian writer, professor of medieval literature and publisher
John Mills (sculptor) (born 1933), English sculptor
John Mills Sr. (1882–1967), American vocalist, father of The Mills Brothers
John Mills Jr. (1910–1936), American vocalist, one of The Mills Brothers

Others
John Mills (businessman) (born 1938), businessman and founder of JML Direct
John Mills (soldier) (1754–1796), U.S. Army acting Adjutant General and acting Inspector General
John Mills (entrepreneur) (1806–1889), Scottish entrepreneur and astronomer
John Mills (Calvinistic Methodist minister) (1812–1873), British Calvinistic Methodist minister
John Cruger Mills (1829–1889), American author and director
John Robert Mills (1916–1998), British physicist and scientific expert on radar
John S. Mills (1906–1996), United States Air Force Major General
John T. Mills (1817–1871), Supreme Court Justice for the Republic of Texas
John W. Mills, president of Paul Smith's College, New York

See also 
Jack Mills (disambiguation)
Jon Mills (born 1978), Canadian golfer
Jon L. Mills (born 1947), law professor and Florida politician
John Mill (disambiguation)